Mungar is a rural locality in the Fraser Coast Region, Queensland, Australia.

Geography

The Mungar Junction to Monto Branch Railway branches from the North Coast railway line at Mungar.

History
Mary River Saw Mill Provisional School opened on 9 July 1875. On 24 Sep 1877 it was renamed Mungar State School.

Education 
Mungar State School is a government primary (Prep-6) school for boys and girls at 1143 Mungar Road. In 2017, the school had an enrolment of 44 students with 3 teachers (2 full-time equivalent) and 4 non-teaching staff (3 full-time equivalent).

See also
Mungar railway station

References

Fraser Coast Region
Localities in Queensland